Cyril Arthur Barlow  (born 22 January 1889) was an English footballer. His regular position was at full back. He was born in Newton Heath, Manchester. He played for Manchester United, Northern Nomads, and New Cross.

External links
MUFCInfo.com profile

1889 births
English footballers
Manchester United F.C. players
Northern Nomads F.C. players
People from Newton Heath
Year of death missing
Association football fullbacks